is a Japanese voice actress affiliated with Stay Luck. Starting off as a stage performer, she began voice acting in numerous video games and anime series, with her first main role being in the game Toys Drive.

Biography
Koichi was born in Nagano Prefecture and raised in Tokyo. She entered a high school with a theater department, where she gained experience performing on stage. Koichi was cast as Minami Iwasaki in a Lucky Star musical titled Lucky Star ≈ On Stage. She became interested in voice acting after watching the Lucky Star anime in order to study her character in the musical. In 2014, Koichi joined the voice acting agency Atomic Monkey, and voiced her first main character in the video game Toys Drive. In April 2021, Koichi left Atomic Monkey and moved to Stay Luck.

Filmography

Television animation
2016
 Nurse Witch Komugi R as Tsukasa Kisaragi
 Battle Spirits Double Drive as Shunta Mogami

2017
 Star-Myu as Female student, female clerk
 Aho-Girl as Akuru Akutsu (young)
 Time Bokan: The Villains' Strike Back as Gokabutton

2018
 Sanrio Boys as Seiichiro Minamoto (young)
 Hakumei and Mikochi as Sasanami
 Märchen Mädchen as Drew Verhoeven
 Layton Mystery Tanteisha: Katori no Nazotoki File as Andy (young)
 High School DxD Hero as Sairaorg (young)
 The Disastrous Life of Saiki K. as Okajima
 Seven Senses of the Reunion as Hiyane, young noble
 Gundam Build Divers as Ron
 Cells at Work! as Immature thymocyte
 Radiant as Mister Bobley
 Cardfight!! Vanguard as Battlefield Storm Sagramore, Naoki Ishida (young)
 The Girl in Twilight as Akio
 Million Arthur as Guyler (young)

2019
 The Price of Smiles as Yuni Vanquish
 W'z as Gai Kishiwada (young)
 My Roommate Is a Cat as Hayato Yasaka
 The Magnificent Kotobuki as Souya
 Demon Slayer: Kimetsu no Yaiba as Hand Demon's brother
 Star Twinkle PreCure as Yumika Nasu

2020
 Infinite Dendrogram as Rook Holmes
 Case File nº221: Kabukicho as Rampo
 Pet as Hiroki (young)
 Interspecies Reviewers as Elza
 Healin' Good Pretty Cure as Sumiko Nagara
 Mewkledreamy as Minako Hoshino
 Monster Girl Doctor as Glenn Litbeit (young)
 I'm Standing on a Million Lives as Yuka Tokitate
 By the Grace of the Gods as Kufo
 Sleepy Princess in the Demon Castle as Dawner the Hero (young)

2021
 Skate-Leading Stars as Kensei Maeshima (young)
 Horimiya as Kakeru Sengoku (young)
 Farewell, My Dear Cramer as Mao Tsukuda
 Night Head 2041 as Yūya Kuroki (young)
 The World's Finest Assassin Gets Reincarnated in Another World as an Aristocrat as Lugh (young)

2022
 World's End Harem as Reito Mizuhara (young)
 The Case Study of Vanitas as Jean-Jacques Chastel (young)
 In the Heart of Kunoichi Tsubaki as Aogiri
 Lycoris Recoil as Sakura Otome
 The Devil Is a Part-Timer!! as Satan Jacob (young)

2023
 Bungo Stray Dogs 4 as Teruko Ōkura
 The Legend of Heroes: Trails of Cold Steel – Northern War as Lavian Winslet
 Tomo-chan Is a Girl! as Junichiro Kubota (young)
 The Fire Hunter as Kaho
 Hell's Paradise: Jigokuraku as Nurugai
 Saint Cecilia and Pastor Lawrence as Eric
 The Idolmaster Cinderella Girls U149 as Haru Yūki
 Yuri Is My Job! as Sumika Tachibana
 Rurouni Kenshin as Myōjin Yahiko
 Shangri-La Frontier as Oicazzo/Kei Uomi

TBA
 I Was Reincarnated as the 7th Prince so I Can Take My Time Perfecting My Magical Ability as Lloyd

Original net animation
2016
 Brotherhood: Final Fantasy XV as Marilith

2018
 B – The Beginning as Nasuka

2019
 Kengan Ashura as Tomoko Matsuda

2021
 The Missing 8 as Punkun

2022
 Shiyakusho as Rin Onoda

Anime films
2019
 Seven Days War as Malet

2022
 The Seven Deadly Sins: Grudge of Edinburgh as Minika

Video games
2014
 Toys Drive as Takuto Leonard

2016
 Labyrinth of Refrain: Coven of Dusk as Fritz
 Pokémon Ga-Olé as Boy Player

2017
 Robot Girls Z Online as Raigarn

2018
 Monster Hunter: World as Receptionist
 The Idolmaster Cinderella Girls as Haru Yūki
 Higurashi no Naku Koro ni Hō as Mion Sonozaki (Hinamizawa Bus Stop)
 Princess Connect! Re:Dive as Kaya
 WarioWare Gold as 9-Volt, Kurina
 Girls' Frontline as F1, M1897

2019
 Samurai Shodown as Shizumaru Hisame

2020
 Caravan Stories as Hayami
 Dragon Quest X as Rascal

2021
 BlazBlue Alternative: Dark War as Akane Teruhiko

2022
 Path to Nowhere as Tetra
 Neural Cloud as Jessie

Dubbing
The Time Traveler's Wife, Young Henry DeTamble (Jason David)

References

External links
 Official agency profile 
 

Japanese stage actresses
Japanese video game actresses
Japanese voice actresses
Living people
Voice actresses from Tokyo
Year of birth missing (living people)